Sultan Kudarat may refer to:

 Sultan Muhammad Dipatuan Kudarat (1581–1671), Sultan of Maguindanao
 Sultan Kudarat, a province in the Philippines named in his honor.
 Sultan Kudarat, Maguindanao del Norte, a municipality also named after him.
 BRP Sultan Kudarat, a corvette of the Philippine Navy